The Witches Hammer is a 2006 low budget English action/horror film written and directed by James Eaves, produced by British production company Amber Pictures, and starring Stephanie Beacham and Claudia Coulter with George Anton as an antagonistic vampire.

Plot
After Rebecca (Claudia Coulter) is attacked in the streets, she is awakened by agents from "Project 571".  She wants to return to her husband and son, but the agents inform her that she cannot because they have "altered" her to be a genetically modified vampire.  Coercing her by promising that she might see her family again, they train her into a highly skilled assassin.

Returning from an assignment and discovering that everyone at Project 571 has been slaughtered, Rebecca is rescued by a warlock named Edward (Jonathan Sidgwick) and taken to Madeline (Stephanie Beacham), the witch who heads "Project 572".  She is told that they need her expertise to retrieve "The Witches Hammer", a spellbook written by the Russian witch Katanya. The book is required to kill the vampire Hugo Renoir (Tom Dover), whose only vulnerability is one of its spells.  As Rebecca and Edward begin their quest, they are set upon by both rival vampires and Hugo's minions, each whom wish the book for themselves.

Cast
 George Anton as Vampire
 Stephanie Beacham as Madeline
 Claudia Coulter as Rebecca
 Tom Dover as Hugo
 Jonathan Sidgwick as Edward
 Tina Barnes as Edward's Wife
 Sam Smith as Masked Man
 Jason Tompkins as Oscar
 Kris Tanaka as ICT substitute teacher Christ The King College Isle Of Wight
 Miguel Ruz as Victor Ferdinand
 Magda Rodriguez as Kitanya
 Harold Gasnier as Le Cardinale 
 Sally Reeve as Charlotte Apone
 Tom Dover as Hugo Renoir
 Kris Tanaka as a Vampires
 Anthony Hampshire as a hammer
 Neil Little as a Terrified Nightclubber #3

Release
First screened at Cannes on 22 May 2006, the film had its theatrical debut in Japan on 22 December 2006 and its DVD premiere on 7 March 2007 in the UK. The film received a nomination for "Best Feature Film" at the 2008 Swansea Film Festival.

Reception
Don Sumner of Best Horror Movies wrote that one can see the "influences of several other popular movies in the way the film’s story progresses and how the scenes are shot", making note of influences from Blade, where the protagonist is skilled in martial arts and, Underworld where vampires and werewolves have an eternal malice toward each other. He summarized by writing "The story is great and engrossing, the characters are interesting and the acting is very good – especially the ice-queen performance of Stephanie Beacham".  Moria Science Fiction, Horror and Fantasy Film Review most enjoyed the way writer/director Eaves crafted a "back mythology" and appreciated that the background of the supporting characters was treated with depth and imagination. Noting that the action scenes felt like they were "boiler-plated in as set-pieces at regular intervals", they felt that they were "convincingly done and come with a stylish, well-choreographed kick".  Andrew Mackenzie of Beyond Hollywood wrote that The Witches Hammer "exists only as an example of the terrible things that happen when filmmakers are heavily influenced by Hollywood."  Rees Savidis of JoBlo.com rated the film 1.5/4 stars and called it amateurish and muddled.  David Johnson of DVD Verdict called it "an achingly abysmal exercise in vampire action-horror".

References

External links
 
  
 
 Das Filmmagazin - Manifest DVD-Review (German)
 Horreur.com, review of The Witches Hammer (French)

2006 films
British action films
British vampire films
British films about revenge
British action horror films
British exploitation films
2000s English-language films
2000s British films